Kollontay (also Kollontai) is a Russian language transcription of the Polish surname Kołłątaj.

It can refer to the following people:
 Alexandra Kollontay (Kollontai) (1872–1952) —  Russian Communist revolutionary, Soviet statesman and ambassador
 Mikhail Kollontay (b. 1952) — Russian composer and pianist

Russian-language surnames